Charles Frederic Moberly Bell (2 April 1847, Alexandria – 5 April 1911, London) was a British journalist and newspaper editor during the late 19th and early 20th centuries.

Early life

Charles Frederic Moberly Bell was born in Alexandria. His mother was Hester Louisa née David, and his father was a merchant.

Both his parents died while Moberly Bell was still a child. He was sent to England to live with relatives and be educated there. He returned to his birthplace in 1865 and worked briefly for the same company as his father had, Peel & Co.

Journalism and The Times

Moberly Bell then found free-lance work with The Times. In 1875, he became its official correspondent in Egypt, and achieved fame with his coverage of the Urabi Revolt of 1882. He founded The Egyptian Gazette in 1880.

During the bombardment of Alexandria in July 1882, he was a guest alongside rival journalist Frederic Villiers on board HMS Condor when its commander Lord Charles Beresford attacked Fort Marabut.

In 1890, Bell was invited by the owner of The Times, Arthur Fraser Walter, to help run the financially shaky paper, considered highly respected but stolid and boring. As managing director, Bell revitalized the title, greatly increasing its staff of foreign correspondents. In 1902, Bell created Literature, a forerunner of The Times Literary Supplement, and in 1910, followed that supplement or spin-off with The Times Educational Supplement. In 1908, Bell helped to engineer its sale to Alfred Harmsworth, later Lord Northcliffe. Bell remained with the paper until his death in 1911.

Encyclopædia Britannica

According to Herman Kogan, Bell's single most notable accomplishment was his deal with American Horace Everett Hooper to reprint and sell the Encyclopædia Britannica under the sponsorship of The Times. Beginning in 1898, Hooper and his advertising executive Henry Haxton introduced aggressive marketing methods (full-page advertisements and direct marketing) to sell a reprint of the Britannica's 9th edition, which was justly famous for its scholarship but by then out of date. Building on the newspaper's solid reputation, Hooper managed to sell over 20,000 sets of the 9th edition and over 70,000 sets of its supplement, the 10th edition. The profit on the 10th edition was in excess of £600,000, and the royalties paid to the paper made it profitable for the first time in years. In 1908, Hooper's legal battle with his business partner Walter Montgomery Jackson caused The Times to cancel its contract to sponsor the 11th edition.

Writing
Bell wrote three books: Khedives and Pashas (1884), Egyptian Finance (1887), and From Pharaoh to Fellah (1889).

Personal life
In 1875 Moberly Bell married Ethel Chataway; the couple had two sons and four daughters.

Moberly Bell's biography was written by his daughter Enid. The Life and Letters of C. F. Moberly Bell was published in 1927, 16 years after his death.

References

External links

British reporters and correspondents
British newspaper editors
The Times people
Encyclopædia Britannica
1847 births
1911 deaths